Alksnėnai (from Lithuanian alder groves) may refer to several Lithuanian villages:
 
 Alksnėnai, Gudžiūnai, in Gudžiūnai Eldership of Kėdainiai District Municipality
 Alksnėnai, Vilainiai, in Vilainiai Eldership of Kėdainiai District Municipality
 Alksnėnai, Plungė, in Šateikiai eldership of Plungė District Municipality
 Alksnėnai, Vilkaviškis, in Vilkaviškis District Municipality; see List of Catholic pilgrimage sites in Lithuania

See also
Alksnynė, a settlement in the Lithuanian part of the Curonian Spit
Olchowo (disambiguation)
Olkhovka